Love & Sex is the third and final studio album by reggaeton duo Plan B. It was released on August 25, 2014 through Sony Music Latin and Pina Records. It features four singles: the lead, "Zapatito Roto" (featuring Tego Calderón), "Candy", "Mi Vecinita" and "Fanática Sensual". On September 27, 2014, the album reached the #2 position on the US Billboard Top Latin Albums charts.

Production

According to Chencho (Orlando Valle), Love & Sex is a product of four years of work, and the duo managed into the composition of the lyrics of his songs, focussing on the identification of the people when listening to the tracks. They decided to name his album so because his followers became to call them "el dúo del sex" (Spanish for "the duo of sex") after debuting on DJ Blass' Reggaeton Sex compilation in 2000. Chencho added that because of the fans increase around the world, they limited the use of explicit words.

Singles

«Zapatito Roto» was released as the first single on April 27, 2013. It was produced by Haze and Duran, and features Tego Calderón, being the third time they work together, after the remix of "Pegaito A La Pared" in 2009 and the remix of "Es Un Secreto" in 2011. It does not have an official music video, there's only an official audio and a lyric video promoting the album. Combining the views of both videos, the song has over 35 million views on YouTube.
«Candy» was released as the second and lead single on September 7, 2013. It was produced by Duran and Luny Tunes. The official audio has over 100 million views on YouTube and his music video (released on December 18, 2013) has over 360 million views. It reached the #28 position on US Billboard Tropical Songs charts. There are two official remixes, featuring De La Ghetto and Jowell & Randy in the first one, and Tempo and Arcángel in the second one.
«Mi Vecinita» was released as the third and second lead single on July 19, 2014. It was produced by Haze and DJ Blass, and mixes reggaeton and argentine cumbia. His lyric video has over 15 million views, while his music video (released on September 9, 2014) has over 450 million views. It reached the #6 position on US Billboard Tropical Songs charts.
«Fanática Sensual» was released as the fourth and third lead single on February 3, 2015. It was produced by Haze and Duran. His lyric video has over 320 million views, while his music video has over 400 million views on YouTube. It reached the top position on US Billboard Tropical Songs charts.  This was the most successful single release of the album peaking at #9 and remaining on the Billboard charts for a total of 63 weeks. There's an official remix featuring Nicky Jam released on April 29, 2015.

Critical reception

David Jeffries from Allmusic said that "reggaeton duo Plan B continue to combine the slick and the traditional, making music that appeals to the current club crowd while keeping it simple and avoiding those jacked-in, ultra-pop choruses whenever possible. Still, singles like "Candy" and collaborations with Tego Calderón ("Zapatito Roto") and Yandel ("Pa'l Piso") are as big as they need to be, so think of 50 Cent's G-Unit crew when it comes to Plan B's perfect balance of the street-worthy and the radio-worthy. Love & Sex continues this legacy, although all the swagger and all the thrills found within suggest that the album's title was printed backwards."

Track listing

Personnel
Some credits adapted from AllMusic.

 Alexis – featured artist
 Ana J. Alvarado – production coordination
 J Alvarez – featured artist
 Víctor Cabrera – musical producer, producer
 Tego Calderón – featured artist
 ClanDestino – featured artist
 Andres Coll – label manager
 David Duran – mezcla, producer
 Fade – musical producer
 Vladimir Felix – musical producer
 Fido – featured artist
 Lennox – featured artist
 Alberto "Montana" Lozada –  musical producer
 Marcos "Tainy" Masis – cmusical producer, producer
 Rafael Pina – executive producer, mezcla
 Plan B – primary artist
 Egbert "Haze" Rosa – musical producer, producer
 Francisco Saldaña – mezcla, producer
 Edwin Vázquez Vega – executive producer
 Orlando J. Valle Vega "Chencho" – executive producer
 Yaileem – featured artist
 Yandel – featured artist
 Zion – featured artist

Charts

Weekly charts

Year-end charts

Songs

References

External links
 iTunes information album

2014 albums
Plan B (duo) albums
Pina Records albums